Alice S. Kandell is an American child psychologist, author, photographer and art collector interested in Himalayan culture. She worked extensively in the Indian state of Sikkim as a photographer, capturing approximately 15,000 color slides, as well as black-and-white photographs, between 1965 and 1979.

Life and career
She initially visited Sikkim in 1965 to attend the coronation ceremony of Hope Cooke, an American woman who married Palden Thondup Namgyal, King of Sikkim. At his request, she started a photograph project to illustrate how he and his wife favoured education and local businesses in Sikkim to benefit its culture.

She is the author or co-author of two books, (with text by Charlotte Salisbury), and a book for children, called Sikkim: The Hidden Kingdom.

Her private collection of Tibetan art was covered in A Shrine for Tibet: The Alice S. Kandell Collection of Tibetan Sacred Art, by Marylin Rhie and Robert Thurman, with photographs by John Bigelow Taylor.

In 2011, she donated a collection of Tibetan art to the Arthur M. Sackler Gallery at the Smithsonian, and about 300 pictures to the Library of Congress.

She is the daughter of Leonard S. Kandell, a developer and investor in Manhattan real estate.

Gallery

Images taken by Alice S. Kandell

Collection of Tibetan art

References

Photographers from New York (state)
Living people
American women photographers
American women psychologists
American art collectors
Women art collectors
Year of birth missing (living people)
21st-century American women
American child psychologists